Hüseynhacılı (also, Guseyngadzhyly and Gusi-Nadzhaly) is a village and municipality in the Masally Rayon of Azerbaijan.  It has a population of 1,040.

References 

Populated places in Masally District